Silver Sevens Hotel and Casino (formerly known as Terrible's) is a Las Vegas locals casino and hotel  east of the Las Vegas Strip, in Paradise, Nevada.  Silver Sevens has 370 rooms and a  casino.

Silver Sevens was the host hotel for the Terrible's special events: The Terrible's 250, Terrible's 300, and Terrible's Cup Baja races sponsored by Terrible Herbst.

History

Continental (1981-99)
The Continental Hotel and Casino opened in 1981.

In 1996, Crowne Ventures agreed to buy the hotel for $35 million. They planned to convert the property into a nostalgia-themed resort to complement their "Back to the 50s" catalog business. But that deal fell through when Crowne fell into bankruptcy. The Continental itself declared bankruptcy in 1998, and was foreclosed on and closed by American Realty Trust in March 1999.

Terrible's (2000-12)

The Herbst family of Terrible Herbst saw an opportunity to open their first gaming property in Las Vegas, as the Continental was too small for locals casino operators Station Casinos and Coast Casinos, but too big for other, smaller slot route operators to acquire. The hotel was sold to E-T-T Gaming, the Herbsts' gaming division (now Affinity Gaming), in November 1999. The Herbsts demolished the building interior, but kept its outer shell. The cost of acquisition and renovation was $65 million. It reopened in December 2000 as Terrible's Hotel and Casino.

The Terrible's name was popular among local residents, who made up 70 percent of the property's clientele. A new hotel tower was added in 2007. An 18-month renovation was completed in January 2013, at a cost of $7 million. Hotel rooms and the sportsbook were among the renovated facilities, and nearly 1,000 new slot machines were added.

Silver Sevens (2013-present)
In mid-2013, Affinity Gaming chose to rename the casino Silver Sevens, reflecting the recent renovation.

Notes

External links

Casinos in the Las Vegas Valley
Hotels in Paradise, Nevada
Hotels established in 1975
Affinity Gaming
Casino hotels